Fulki River (Falki River) is a river in western India in Gujarat whose origin is near the village of Lilpar. Its drainage basin has a maximum length of 18 km. The total catchment area of the basin is 120 km2.

References

Rivers of Gujarat
Rivers of India